Society Hill is an unincorporated community in Macon County, Alabama, United States.

History
The community is likely named after Society Hill, South Carolina. Society Hill was once home to the Society Hill High School.

A post office operated under the name Society Hill from 1837 to 1914.

James Torbert served as the first postmaster of Society Hill. Torbert's grandson, Clement Clay Torbert, was born in Society Hill but moved to Opelika to operate a store and bank. Clement Clay's grandson, C. C. Torbert Jr., served as the twenty-fifth Chief Justice of the Alabama Supreme Court from 1977 through 1989.

References

Unincorporated communities in Macon County, Alabama
Unincorporated communities in Alabama